Graham Fitkin (born 19 April 1963) is a British composer, pianist and conductor. His compositions fall broadly into the minimalist and postminimalist genres. Described by The Independent in 1998 as "one of the most important of our younger composers", he is particularly known for his works for solo and multiple pianos, as well as for music accompanying dance.

Biography
Fitkin was born at Crows-an-Wra in west Cornwall on 19 April 1963. His mother, a piano teacher, encouraged his early studies on that instrument. He participated in numerous local ensembles during his childhood, and recalls starting to compose at the piano aged around 8. In 1981–4, he attended the University of Nottingham, where he studied with composer Nigel Osborne, among others. He later went to the Netherlands to study with the minimalist composer and pianist Louis Andriessen at the Royal Conservatory of The Hague. In 1987, he moved to London.

Fitkin returned to Cornwall in 1991 and, as of 2010, lives in Treen. His partner is harpist Ruth Wall, with whom he collaborates in Fitkin Wall.

Music
Fitkin's work is broadly classified as minimalist and postminimalist. His works are tonal and frequently complex. Much of his writing is for the piano, including solo and multiple player works. Fitkin lists his early classical influences as Igor Stravinsky, Anton Webern, Pierre Boulez and the American minimalist Steve Reich, and also acknowledges a broad range of influences outside the field of classical music, from jazz musicians Keith Jarrett, Muggsy Spanier and Miles Davis, and popular singer Frank Sinatra, to modern pop groups such as The Smiths, Wire and the Pet Shop Boys. Subsequent influences include Louis Andriessen, Gavin Bryars and Laurence Crane.

Fitkin's earliest compositions were for piano, including From Yellow to Yellow and The Cone Gatherers. The Nanquidno group, which he co-founded in 1985, consisted of four pianists using two keyboards. Several of his early works, including Log, Line and Loud, were composed for the six-piano ensemble, Piano Circus. He has also written several works for pianist Kathryn Stott, including Circuit for two pianos and orchestra, which was composed for Stott and Noriko Ogawa in 2002 to a commission from the BBC.

The success of his early compositions for piano, particularly The Cone Gatherers, led to Fitkin being commissioned to write his first ensemble work, Cud, for jazz orchestra. Cud and Fitkin's other early ensemble works including Hook and Stub often make use of electronic instruments and percussion, and are influenced by jazz and rock. A more recent work for electronic instruments is the album Kaplan, which was inspired by the character George Kaplan from Alfred Hitchcock's film, North by Northwest. In 1994–96, Fitkin was the composer-in-residence at the Royal Liverpool Philharmonic, and during the mid-to-late 1990s he composed twelve orchestral pieces including a clarinet concerto. He has composed several works for musical theatre, including the short opera Ghosts, and has also written or adapted several pieces for contemporary dance, including Huoah.

Recent projects include Still Warm, a work for multiple harps, which was composed for the Eden Project in 2006. The sextet Sinew, written for the Fibonacci Sequence, was first performed in 2009. For Yo Yo Ma, he has written a cello concerto which was premiered at the 2011 BBC Proms, as well as a work for cello and piano, titled L, composed for the performer's fiftieth birthday (2005). A BBC commission for orchestra and chorus, titled PK, was also premiered at the Proms in 2010. In a recent project called Fitkin, a group comprising 9 virtuoso musicians has been touring the UK since early 2010. In December 2010, it was announced that Fitkin had been selected as one of twenty composers to participate in the New Music 20x12 project as part of the London 2012 Cultural Olympiad. Fitkin will compose a new work for the London Chamber Orchestra to be premiered in 2012.

In 1996, he formed the Graham Fitkin Group. His work has been released by Decca's Argo label, Sanctuary's Black Box label, BIS Records and Factory Classical. He founded a personal label, GFR, to release Still Warm.

Awards
In 1994, Fitkin won the International Grand Prix Music for Dance Video Award. He has twice won British Composer Awards: in 2009, Reel won the Stage Works category; in 2011, PK won the Outreach category.

Selected works
Solo and multiple pianos
From Yellow to Yellow (1985)
The Cone Gatherers (1987)
Loud (1989), for six pianos
Flak (1989), for two pianos/eight hands
Log (1990), for six pianos
Line (1991), for six pianos
Fervent (1992–94)
Piano Pieces 93 (1993)
Relent (1998)

Piano and orchestra
Granite (1995)
Circuit (2002)
Ruse (2009)

Orchestral
Cud (1988)
Length (1994)
Bebeto (1995)
Henry (1995)
Metal (1995)
Clarinet Concerto (1998)
Reel (2008)
PK (2010), with choir
Cello Concerto (2011)
Recorder Concerto (2017)

Ensemble
Ironic (1997)
Bed (1998)
Beethoven 7 (2000)

Other
Huoah (1988), for brass band; rewritten as ballet score (1995)
Slow (1990), for string quartet and two keyboards
Hook (1991), for percussion quartet
Skirting (2001), for solo guitar
Lens (2003), for piano trio
Pawn (2004), for string quartet
Geography (2004), for computers and video
Kaplan (2004), multimedia
L (2005), for cello and piano
Still Warm (2006), for electronically manipulated harps
Sinew (2009), sextet for violin, viola, cello, clarinet, horn and piano

Partial discography
Skirting, Jim and Pam and Pam and Jim on The Uncommon Harp (compilation) – Ruth Wall
Ironic, and other ensemble works – Graham Fitkin Group
Granite – Peter Donohoe (piano), Petr Altrichter and Graham Fitkin (conductors), Royal Liverpool Philharmonic
Flak, and other piano works – various (Factory Classical; 1991)
Slow, Huoah, Frame – Smith Quartet (Argo; 1992)
Log, Line, Loud – Piano Circus (Argo; 1992)
Hook, Mesh, Stub, Cud – various (Argo; 1993)
Kaplan – Graham Fitkin and Ruth Wall (Black Box; 2003)
 Hook, Mesh, Stub, Cud, Log, Line, Loud, Hard Fairy – various (Decca; 2004)
Still Warm – Fitkin Wall (GFR; 2007)
Circuit, Relent, Carnal, and other piano works – Noriko Ogawa and Kathryn Stott (piano), Naoto Otomo (conductor), Tokyo Symphony Orchestra (BIS Records; 2010)

References

External links

Official website of Graham Fitkin
Official website of FitkinWall
Official Myspace of Graham Fitkin

1963 births
20th-century classical composers
21st-century classical composers
Alumni of the University of Nottingham
British ballet composers
Contemporary classical music performers
English classical composers
English film score composers
English male film score composers
Living people
People from St Buryan
Factory Records artists
2012 Cultural Olympiad
Royal Conservatory of The Hague alumni
Pupils of Louis Andriessen
20th-century English composers
21st-century English composers
20th-century British male musicians
21st-century British male musicians